Lauria cylindracea, common name "the common chrysalis snail", is a species of air-breathing land snail, a terrestrial pulmonate gastropod mollusk in the family Lauriidae.

Description
For terms see gastropod shell

The 3-4 x 1.8 mm shell is oval with a blunt apex and 5-6 weakly convex whorls. The last whorl has the largest diameter. The aperture with parietalis and with or without angular tooth. The margin is white, sharp and reflected in fully grown specimens, usually with a whitish parietal callus. The umbilicus is open and narrow. The shell colour is brown, transparent and shiny. It is weakly striated. Juveniles have additional folds visible from outside the shell. The animal is dark with lighter sides and foot. The upper tentacles are short, the lower tentacles very short. The animal crawls with the shell in a high and almost straight position.

Distribution
This species is known to occur in a number of countries and islands:
 Great Britain
 Ireland
 Ukraine
 Portugal
 and other areas

It has been introduced to:
 British Columbia, Canada
 New Zealand

References

External links 
 Lauria cylindracea at Animalbase taxonomy,short description, distribution, biology,status (threats), images
Lauria cylindracea at  Encyclopedia of Life
 Series of good images at: Discover Life
 More images: 

Lauria (gastropod)
Molluscs of the Atlantic Ocean
Taxa named by Emanuel Mendes da Costa
Gastropods described in 1778